Henry Frederick "Buck" Danner (June 8, 1891 – September 21, 1949) was an American Major League Baseball infielder. He played for the Philadelphia Athletics during the  season.

References

Major League Baseball infielders
Philadelphia Athletics players
Baseball players from Massachusetts
Sportspeople from Dedham, Massachusetts
1891 births
1949 deaths